Wajs is a Polish surname. Notable people with the surname include:

 Bronisława Wajs (1908–1987), Romani Polish classic poet and singer
 Jadwiga Wajs (1912–1990), Polish athlete
 Joanna Wajs (born 1979), Polish writer, literary critic and translator

See also
 Ollech & Wajs, Swiss watch company
 WAJS (91.7 FM), contemporary Christian radio station based in Tupelo, Mississippi, owned by the American Family Association

Polish-language surnames